The Dalguise Viaduct is a lattice girder viaduct in Dalguise, Perth and Kinross, Scotland. It carries the Highland Main Line railway across the River Tay. Built in 1863, it was designed by Joseph Mitchell, for the then-new Inverness and Perth Junction Railway.

The viaduct is in two parts; the southern one being , the northern . The ironwork was supplied by Sir William Fairbairn & Sons, of Manchester.

References

External links
Dalguise Viaduct – RailScot

Bridges in Perth and Kinross
Bridges completed in 1863
Viaducts in Scotland
Steel bridges
Railway bridges in Scotland
Category A listed buildings in Perth and Kinross
Listed bridges in Scotland